The Old Four is a soccer conference composed of four public institutions of higher education in Central Canada. The name is also an appellation for the four universities as a group, consisted of McGill University, Queen's University, University of Toronto and University of Western Ontario. They are home to the original four soccer teams in Canadian collegiate athletics. The Old Four holds an annual exhibition tournament over the Labour Day weekend, although the teams do not accumulate points toward the regular season of the Canadian Interuniversity Sport competition.

As the name suggests, the Old Four schools are among Canada's oldest and most prestigious universities. Except for the University of Western Ontario, all were founded by royal charter during the British colonial era before Canadian Confederation. Historically, these schools have held intense rivalries in athletics. Today, the Old Four are all research universities and members of Canada's U15 Group of Canadian research universities. They are the only universities in eastern Canada with endowments of over $1 billion respectively. 

The Old Four was for several decades also a conference for Canadian football competition between these same four schools, but conference realignment, beginning in the early 1970s, has meant that it no longer exists in its original form.

Members
The Old Four schools are all public institutions unaffiliated with any religion. Although three were founded as religious schools, they have all since become secular institutions.

Summary of tournament finals

Note: The 2011 finals were cancelled due to field conditions.

References

External links
 McGill Athletics
 Queen's Golden Gaels
 Toronto Varsity Blues
 Western Mustangs

Conference news
 https://web.archive.org/web/20060509054448/http://universitysport.ca/e/w_fieldhockey/story_detail.cfm?id=5898
 https://web.archive.org/web/20060220081001/http://www.goldengaels.com/interuniversity/soccerm.html
 https://web.archive.org/web/20051016033626/http://www.varsityblues.ca/news/?id=2572 
 Mustangs blank Redmen in Old Four gold medal game - Aug 26, 2007 
 McGill claims Old Four soccer titles - August 31, 2008 
 Old Four Tournament wraps up at Queen's 8/29/2010

College athletics conferences in Canada
University and college soccer in Canada
Universities in Ontario
Universities in Quebec
Soccer competitions in Canada